John Thomas Scopes (August 3, 1900 – October 21, 1970) was a teacher in Dayton, Tennessee, who was charged on May 5, 1925, with violating Tennessee's Butler Act, which prohibited the teaching of human evolution in Tennessee schools. He was tried in a case known as the Scopes Monkey Trial, in which he was found guilty and fined $100.

Early life
Scopes was born in 1900 to Thomas Scopes and Mary Alva Brown, who lived on a farm in Paducah, Kentucky. John was the fifth child and only son. The family moved to Danville, Illinois when he was a teenager. In 1917, he moved to Salem, Illinois, where he was a member of the class of 1919 at Salem High School.

He attended the University of Illinois briefly then left for health reasons. He earned a degree at the University of Kentucky in 1924, with a major in law and a minor in geology.

Scopes moved to Dayton where he became the Rhea County High School's football coach, and occasionally served as a substitute teacher.

Trial
Scopes' involvement in the so-called Scopes Monkey Trial came about after the American Civil Liberties Union (ACLU) announced that it would finance a test case challenging the constitutionality of the Butler Act if it could find a Tennessee teacher who was willing to act as a defendant.

A band of businessmen in Dayton, Tennessee, led by engineer and geologist George Rappleyea, saw this as an opportunity to get publicity for their town, and they approached Scopes. Rappleyea pointed out that while the Butler Act prohibited the teaching of human evolution, the state required teachers to use the assigned textbook, Hunter's Civic Biology (1914), which included a chapter on evolution. Rappleyea argued that teachers were essentially required to break the law. When asked about the test case, Scopes was initially reluctant to get involved. After some discussion he told the group gathered in Robinson's Drugstore, "If you can prove that I've taught evolution and that I can qualify as a defendant, then I'll be willing to stand trial."

By the time the trial had begun, the defense team included Clarence Darrow, Dudley Field Malone, John Neal, Arthur Garfield Hays and Frank McElwee. The prosecution team, led by Tom Stewart, included brothers Herbert Hicks and Sue K. Hicks, Wallace Haggard, father and son pairings Ben and J. Gordon McKenzie, and William Jennings Bryan and William Jennings Bryan Jr. The elder Bryan had spoken at Scopes' high school commencement, and remembered the defendant was laughing while he was giving the address to the graduating class six years earlier.

The case ended on July 21, 1925, with a guilty verdict, and Scopes was fined $100 (Roughly $1,460 in 2020). The case was appealed to the Tennessee Supreme Court. In a 3–1 decision written by Chief Justice Grafton Green, the Butler Act was held to be constitutional, but the court overturned Scopes's conviction because the judge had set the fine instead of the jury. The Butler Act remained in effect until May 18, 1967 when it was repealed by the Tennessee legislature.

Scopes may have been innocent of the crime to which his name is inexorably linked. After the trial, he admitted to reporter William Kinsey Hutchinson "I didn't violate the law," explaining that he had skipped the evolution lesson and that his lawyers had coached his students to go on the stand; the Dayton businessmen had assumed that he had violated the law. Hutchinson did not file his story until after the Scopes appeal was decided in 1927.

In 1955, the trial was made into a play titled Inherit the Wind starring Paul Muni as a character based on Clarence Darrow and Ed Begley as a character based on William Jennings Bryan. In 1960, a film version of the play starred Spencer Tracy as the Darrow character and Fredric March as the Bryan character.

Both the play and the film engage in literary license with the facts. For example, the character of Bertram Cates is shown being arrested in class, thrown in jail, burned in effigy by frenzied, mean-spirited, and ignorant townspeople, and taunted by a fire-snorting preacher. The character of Matthew Harrison Brady, an almost comical fanatic, dramatically dies of a "busted belly" while attempting to deliver his summation in a chaotic courtroom. None of these incidents happened in Dayton, Tennessee during the trial.

Life after the trial

The results of the Scopes Trial affected him professionally and personally. His public image was mocked in animation, cartoons and other media in the following years. Scopes retreated from the public eye and focused his attention on his career.

In September 1925, he enrolled in the graduate school of University of Chicago to finish his studies in geology. Evidence of harassment by the press was highlighted by Frank Thorne: “You may be interested to know that Mr. John T. Scopes of anti-evolution trial fame expects to take up the study of geology as a graduate student of Chicago this fall…Please do what you can to protect him from the importunities of Chicago reporters….He is a modest and unassuming young chap, and has been subjected to a great deal more limelight than he likes.”  A year later, the Tennessee Supreme Court decision of 1926 prompted the press to pursue Scopes again. During this time, he wrote to Thorne, “I am tired of fooling with them.”  It is evident that the media attention was affecting Scopes emotionally.

Even worse, the Depression affected his career.  After graduation, he was "barred" from career opportunities in Tennessee, requiring him and his wife to move into his childhood home in Kentucky around 1930.

Having failed in education, Scopes attempted a political career and entered an unsuccessful bid as a candidate of the Socialist Party for a seat in the U.S. House of Representatives in Kentucky's only at-large congressional race in 1932. In the end, Scopes returned to the oil industry, serving as an oil expert for the United Production Corporation, later known as United Gas Corporation. There, he first worked in Beeville, Texas, then in the company’s Houston office until 1940, and later in Shreveport, Louisiana, where he stayed until his death. United Gas merged into what was Pennzoil in 1968.

Later in his life, the media surrounding Scopes calmed down. Occasionally, he was dragged into the spotlight, including attendance of the 1960 premiere of Inherit the Wind, acceptance of the key to the city, and participation in the celebration of John T. Scopes Day.

Scopes and the story of his trial were featured on the television game show To Tell the Truth on October 10, 1960.

In June 1967, Scopes wrote Center of the Storm: Memoirs of John T. Scopes. The Butler Act was repealed that same year.

Personal life and death
Scopes married Mildred Elizabeth Scopes (née Walker) (1905–1990). Together they had two sons: John Thomas Jr. and William Clement "Bill".

He died on October 21, 1970 of cancer in Shreveport, Louisiana at age 70.

See also
Mildred Seydell

References

Sources

Further reading
Books

Web

External links
 

1900 births
1970 deaths
20th-century American geologists
Schoolteachers from Tennessee
Socialist Party of America politicians from Kentucky
Burials in Kentucky
Converts to Roman Catholicism
People from Marion County, Illinois
People from Paducah, Kentucky
People from Rhea County, Tennessee
People from Danville, Illinois
Scopes Trial
University of Chicago alumni
University of Kentucky alumni
People from Salem, Illinois
Writers from Kentucky
Deaths from cancer in Louisiana
20th-century American educators